The following articles contain lists of Jo Stafford compilation albums:

List of Jo Stafford compilation albums (1955–1999)
List of Jo Stafford compilation albums (2000–2009)
List of Jo Stafford compilation albums (2010–present)